Suizen (吹禅) (“blowing Zen”) is a Zen practice consisting of playing the traditional Japanese shakuhachi bamboo flute as a means of attaining self-realization. Suizen was traditionally practiced by the Komusō (“monks of emptiness”), the Zen Buddhist monks of the Fuke sect of Japan who flourished during the Edo period (1600 to 1868).

Instrumental music is rare in all Buddhist practice where instruments usually accompany ritual chants if they are used at all. With suizen, the playing of the shakuhachi as a spiritual exercise is at the core of the religious practice, making it unique in the world of Buddhism.

The practice of suizen may be understood in the context of both ancient Buddhist and Chinese classics which exerted a profound influence on Japanese music, which used awareness of sound as a medium of enlightenment.

Breath is also of fundamental significance as the standard practice of sitting Zen meditation (zazen) and so there is a natural link between zazen and suizen. The type of breathing technique required varies from school to school within suizen.

The concept of ichi on jo butsu – the attainment of enlightenment through a single note – became an important aspect of the Fuke sect’s ‘blowing Zen’ as it developed in later periods. The sound produced by the instrument, which was taught along strict and traditional lines in the suizen schools, is not considered important. It is the practice of blowing which leads to enlightenment.

In 1823 Hisamatsu Fūyō (Hisamatsu Masagoro Suga no Sandaharu – c. 1790s to c. 1880s) published his short treatise on suizen practice, Hitori Mondō (“self-questioning”). Here, Hisamatsu Fūyō speaks of “going all the way with intellect and then going beyond intellect” on the path to enlightenment. He distinguishes the form (jitsu) of shakuhachi music played for entertainment from the emptiness (kyo) of Zen instrumental practice.

The shakuhachi repertoire derives from the Fuke original solo pieces, the Honkyoku. For suizen practitioners these are traditionally played in the manner of a personal spiritual practice and not as a public performance.

The traditions of Fuke Zen and suizen continue today both in Japan and around the world.

References

See also
 Honkyoku
 Komusō
 Fuke-shū

Zen
Zen art and culture
Buddhist music
Japanese styles of music